Siedliska may refer to the following places in Poland:
Siedliska, Lower Silesian Voivodeship (south-west Poland)
Siedliska, Biłgoraj County in Lublin Voivodeship (east Poland)
Siedliska, Krasnystaw County in Lublin Voivodeship (east Poland)
Siedliska, Lubartów County in Lublin Voivodeship (east Poland)
Siedliska, Łódź Voivodeship (central Poland)
Siedliska, Łuków County in Lublin Voivodeship (east Poland)
Siedliska, Gorlice County in Lesser Poland Voivodeship (south Poland)
Siedliska, Tomaszów Lubelski County in Lublin Voivodeship (east Poland)
Siedliska, Miechów County in Lesser Poland Voivodeship (south Poland)
Siedliska, Włodawa County in Lublin Voivodeship (east Poland)
Siedliska, Zamość County in Lublin Voivodeship (east Poland)
Siedliska, Gmina Koniusza in Lesser Poland Voivodeship (south Poland)
Siedliska, Gmina Koszyce in Lesser Poland Voivodeship (south Poland)
Siedliska, Tarnów County in Lesser Poland Voivodeship (south Poland)
Siedliska, Brzozów County in Subcarpathian Voivodeship (south-east Poland)
Siedliska, Przemyśl County in Subcarpathian Voivodeship (south-east Poland)
Siedliska, Rzeszów County in Subcarpathian Voivodeship (south-east Poland)
Siedliska, Masovian Voivodeship (east-central Poland)
Siedliska, Konin County in Greater Poland Voivodeship (west-central Poland)
Siedliska, Turek County in Greater Poland Voivodeship (west-central Poland)
Siedliska, Racibórz County in Silesian Voivodeship (south Poland)
Siedliska, Zawiercie County in Silesian Voivodeship (south Poland)
Siedliska, Olesno County in Opole Voivodeship (south-west Poland)
Siedliska, Opole County in Opole Voivodeship (south-west Poland)
Siedliska, Ełk County in Warmian-Masurian Voivodeship (north Poland)
Siedliska, Giżycko County in Warmian-Masurian Voivodeship (north Poland)
Siedliska, Szczytno County in Warmian-Masurian Voivodeship (north Poland)